Százhalombattai KE  is a team handball club from Százhalombatta, Hungary. Currently, it competes in the Hungarian Championship of Men's Handball.

Kits

2008/09 Team

1  Vitáris Norbert
2  Nikolicza Renáto
3  Balázs Tibor
4  Varga Péter
5  Czina József dr.
6  Nagy Máté
8  Igor Milicevic
10  Jakab László
11  Mohácsi Árpád
12  Perger Zsolt
14  Horvát Szilárd
15  Juhász Károly
16  Pásztor István
17  Mészáros László
18  Dénes János
19  Papp Márk

Previous Squads

Former club members

Notable former players

 József Czina (2007-2008)
 János Dénes
 Árpád Mohácsi
 Máté Nagy
 Zsolt Perger
  Norbert Visy (2005)
 Norbert Vitáris
 Igor Milicevic

External links
  
 

Hungarian handball clubs
Sport in Pest County